Jochen "Joe" Helper (born 29 September 1959) is an Australian politician who represented Ripon in the Victorian Legislative Assembly from 1999 to 2014, representing the Labor Party.

Helper was first elected in the 1999 election on the back of the anti-Kennett rural swing and has held this normally Liberal seat until his resignation in 2014. After the 2006 election Helper was appointed to the cabinet as Minister for Agriculture. He gained the small business portfolio in a reshuffle in August 2007 following the accession of John Brumby to the premiership.

References

 

1959 births
Living people
Australian Labor Party members of the Parliament of Victoria
Members of the Victorian Legislative Assembly
German emigrants to Australia
21st-century Australian politicians
Victorian Ministers for Agriculture